The stripe-crowned spinetail (Cranioleuca pyrrhophia) is a species of bird in the family Furnariidae.
It is found in Argentina, Bolivia, Brazil, Paraguay, and Uruguay.
Its natural habitats are subtropical or tropical dry forest and subtropical or tropical moist lowland forest. The species shows considerable plumage variation following Gloger's rule. It is known to hybridize with Cranioleuca obsoleta in Southern Rio Grande do Sul, Brazil.

References

stripe-crowned spinetail
Birds of Argentina
Birds of Bolivia
Birds of Paraguay
Birds of Uruguay
stripe-crowned spinetail
Taxa named by Louis Jean Pierre Vieillot
Taxonomy articles created by Polbot